The Elliott-Meek House is a historic house at 761 Washington Street in Camden, Arkansas.  The two-story wood-frame house was built in 1857 by James Thomas Elliott, a local judge and later state senator.  It is a well-preserved example of Camden's pre-Civil War prosperity, and a good example of Greek Revival styling.  It also has triple-hung sash windows on its main facade, a rarity in the state.

The house was listed on the National Register of Historic Places in 1974.

See also
National Register of Historic Places listings in Ouachita County, Arkansas

References

Houses on the National Register of Historic Places in Arkansas
Greek Revival houses in Arkansas
Houses completed in 1857
Houses in Ouachita County, Arkansas
Individually listed contributing properties to historic districts on the National Register in Arkansas
Buildings and structures in Camden, Arkansas
National Register of Historic Places in Ouachita County, Arkansas
1857 establishments in Arkansas